Calcium-binding and coiled-coil domain-containing protein 2 is a protein that in humans is encoded by the CALCOCO2 gene.

The protein encoded by this gene is a subunit of nuclear domain 10 (ND10) bodies. ND10 bodies are nuclear domains appearing immunohistochemically as ten dots per nucleus. They are believed to be associated with the nuclear matrix on the basis of their resistance to nuclease digestion and salt extraction. ND10 proteins are removed from the nucleus by HSV-1 infection and may have a role in viral life cycles.

CALCOCO2 is an autophagy receptor, and loss of CALCOCO2 in human beta cells has been linked to autophagy-mediated altered insulin granule homeostasis. Thus, mutations in CALCOCO2 have been linked to type 2 diabetes risk.

References

Further reading

External links